Jonas Henriksen (born 6 March 1991) is a Danish footballer.

References

External links
 Jonas Henriksen profile at AB Official website

Danish men's footballers
1991 births
Living people
Association football defenders
People from Herlev Municipality
Danish Superliga players
F.C. Copenhagen players
Lyngby Boldklub players
Akademisk Boldklub players
FC Helsingør players
Sportspeople from the Capital Region of Denmark